Francisco Vargas may refer to:

 Francisco Vargas (athlete) (born 1963), Colombian Olympic racewalker
 Francisco Vargas (Mexican boxer) (born 1984), Mexican lightweight boxer
 Francisco Vargas (Puerto Rican boxer), Puerto Rican light welterweight boxer